The St. Joseph's Church and Parochial School in Hays, Kansas is a historic church and school at 210 W. 13th and 217 W. 13th.  They were added to the National Register in 2008.

Listed are the St. Joseph's Church and the St. Joseph's Parochial School across the street, but not another school building.  The church is a two-and-a-half-story built in 1904.  The school is a three-and-a-half-story limestone building.

References

Churches in Ellis County, Kansas
Churches in the Roman Catholic Diocese of Salina
Defunct schools in Kansas
Churches on the National Register of Historic Places in Kansas
Roman Catholic churches completed in 1904
Romanesque Revival church buildings in Kansas
School buildings on the National Register of Historic Places in Kansas
National Register of Historic Places in Ellis County, Kansas
Buildings and structures in Hays, Kansas
20th-century Roman Catholic church buildings in the United States